Operation Varsity Blues: The College Admissions Scandal is an American documentary film about the 2019 college admissions bribery scandal. The movie stars Matthew Modine as Rick Singer and features reenactments as well as interviews with real people involved in the scandal.

Cast 
 Matthew Modine as Rick Singer
 Roger Rignack as John B Wilson
 Jillian Peterson as Lead FBI Agent
 Wallace Langham as Gordon Caplan
 Jeff Rector as Devin Sloane
 Courtney Rackley as Jane Buckingham
 Josh Stamberg as Bill McGlashan
 Jeremy Sless as Guidance Counselor

Production
Production took place in 2020. Due to the COVID-19 pandemic the production was delayed.

Release
The documentary was released on Netflix on March 17, 2021. The documentary was one of the top ten most watched films on Netflix.

Reception
On Rotten Tomatoes the documentary holds an approval rating of 88%. Matthew Modine's performance was well received with Salon magazine writing that his performance was a "convincing interpretation of Singer's intense physicality." 
Clarie McNear of The Ringer, thought the documentary was "delicious" although it failed "to cover much new ground." Kelly Lawler of USA Today wrote that the documentary "lacks any uniqueness in its staid narrative."

Lawsuit
On April 6, 2021, Netflix was sued for defamation by John B. Wilson and his family. The Wilson family alleged that the documentary misrepresented them by portraying them as guilty and complicit in the scandal. In October 2021, John B. Wilson was convicted of conspiracy to commit bribery and fraud.

References

External links

2021 films
2021 documentary films
American documentary films
Films about the upper class
2020s English-language films
2020s American films